Melvin Torrence Bratton (born February 2, 1965) is a former American football running back and current sports agent. Bratton attended the University of Miami, where he played running back and starred in the national championship game at the 1988 Orange Bowl against Oklahoma, where he blew out his knee.

Bratton was drafted by the Miami Dolphins in 1988 but did not make the team.  He reentered the draft the following year and was drafted again in 1989 by the Denver Broncos.  Bratton played for the Broncos for two seasons, though never recovered his full athletic ability after the knee injury he suffered in the 1988 Orange Bowl.

College
Bratton starred in the 1987 national championship game, the Orange Bowl, against the Oklahoma Sooners. During the game, he suffered a serious injury to his knee, an injury that may have cost him an estimated one million dollars in the NFL because of the diminution it caused in his draft status. At the end of his career, he held the University of Miami record for career touchdowns with 33.

Bratton was interviewed about his time at the University of Miami for the documentary The U, which premiered December 12, 2009 on ESPN.

NFL career
Bratton was originally drafted by the Miami Dolphins in the sixth round of the 1988 NFL Draft but never signed a contract with the Dolphins.

In the seventh round of the 1989 NFL Draft, the Broncos drafted Bratton as the 180th overall pick. He rushed for 190 yards and 4 touchdowns on 57 carries in his brief career. He also added 345 receiving yards and 4 touchdowns on 39 catches. He also returned 5 kickoffs for total of 56 yards averaging 11.2 yards. He scored the winning touchdown to beat the Pittsburgh Steelers in the divisional playoff round after which he said, "I'm glad I got it. In the past, every time I score the winning touchdown, we lose." One such game was the infamous 1984 Miami vs. Boston College game, where Bratton had four touchdowns including a 52 yard score and the go ahead score, which would have sealed the game for Miami if not for the Hail Mary.

In Super Bowl XXIV, in which the Broncos lost to the San Francisco 49ers 55–10, Bratton caught one 14-yard pass from John Elway. He retired after the 1990 season.

Later career
In 1997, Bratton became a scout for the Atlanta Falcons. Bratton became coordinator of NFC pro personnel with the Washington Redskins in 2000. After Redskins owner Dan Snyder fired him from the front office, Bratton founded sports apparel company College Throwback USA.

Bratton became a sports agent after his playing career. Currently, Bratton is employed by Vantage Management Group. In 2008, the NFL began an inquiry into Bratton for contacting Andre Smith, then a college football player for Alabama.

Personal life
Born in Miami, Florida, Bratton graduated from Miami Northwestern High School in 1983. Bratton is a cousin of Geno Smith, Seattle Seahawks quarterback. He married Eugenia Bratton June 11, 2011.

References

1965 births
Living people
Players of American football from Miami
Miami Northwestern Senior High School alumni
American football running backs
Miami Hurricanes football players
Denver Broncos players
American sports agents
Sportspeople from Miami